Cuthbert Edwy Talma, KA (22 December 1909 -  5 August 1994 )  was a Barbadian politician who served as the 2nd Deputy Prime Minister of Barbados from 10 September 1971 to 2 September 1976 under the Errol Barrow administration.

References 

 

1909 births
1994 deaths
Barbadian knights
Deputy Prime Ministers of Barbados
Knights and Dames of St Andrew (Barbados)